Hellmouth may refer to:

 Hellmouth, an image in art depicting the entrance to hell
 Hellmouth (band), a punk rock band from Detroit
 Hellmouth (film), a 2014 horror film starring Stephen McHattie